SH5, SH-5, or similar may refer to:
 Harbin SH-5, a Chinese maritime patrol amphibious aircraft 
 Sheremetev Sh-5, a 1930s two-seat sailplane
 Siemens-Halske Sh 5, an air-cooled, radial engine for aircraft built in Germany in the 1920s
 Silent Hill: Homecoming, the sixth installment in the Silent Hill survival horror video game series
 Silent Hunter 5: Battle of the Atlantic, a submarine simulation for Microsoft Windows developed by Ubisoft Romania
 Slaughterhouse-Five, a 1969 satirical novel by Kurt Vonnegut
 SuperH 5, a 32-bit RISC instruction set
 State Highway 5, see List of highways numbered 5